"Darkest Africa" is a 22-page Disney comics short story written, drawn, and lettered by Carl Barks. It was first published in March of Comics #20 (1948). The story features Donald Duck, Huey, Dewey, and Louie, Sir Gnatbugg-Mothley, and Professor McFiendy. The story has been reprinted many times. It has been criticized for its stereotypical depictions of Africans and the casual abuse of insects and animals.

Plot
At the urging of Sir Gnatbugg-Mothley, Donald and his nephews go to Africa in search of the world's rarest butterfly, Almostus extinctus. Professor McFiendy is also searching for this butterfly and the two butterfly-hunting parties frequently encounter each other with disastrous results. When McFiendy finally captures the last specimen of the butterfly, the nephews find a nest of caterpillars which burst into dozens of Almostus extinctus butterflies. The species is no longer the rarest of butterflies. Donald and the nephews return home disappointed.

See also
 List of Disney comics by Carl Barks

References
 Grand Comics Database
 

Disney comics stories
Donald Duck comics by Carl Barks
1948 in comics